The 2007 Women's Indoor Hockey World Cup was the second edition of this tournament, played from 14 to 18 February 2007 in Vienna, Austria.

Results

Pool A

Pool B

Fifth to twelfth place classification

Eleventh and twelfth place

Ninth and tenth place

Seventh and eighth place

Fifth and sixth place

First to fourth place classification

Semi-finals

Third and fourth place

Final

Statistics

Final standings

Goalscorers

See also
 2007 Men's Indoor Hockey World Cup

References

External links
 Official website

Indoor Hockey World Cup
Indoor Hockey World Cup Women
Women's Indoor Hockey World Cup
Sports competitions in Vienna
Indoor Hockey World Cup Women
International women's field hockey competitions hosted by Austria
World Cup